M1900 may refer to:

 FN M1900 or Browning M1900, pistol
 Colt M1900, pistol
 76 mm gun M1900
 Mannlicher M1900, a rifle, see Ferdinand Mannlicher
 M1900 variant of the Hotchkiss M1914 machine gun
 5-inch gun M1900, a US Army artillery piece
 6-inch gun M1900, a US Army artillery piece

See also
 M0 (disambiguation)